Jan Kmita z Wiśnicza (ca. 1330 - died 1376 in Kraków) was a Polish knight.

He became general starost of Ruthenia and Sieradz (1351–1367), starost of Lwów (1371) and starost of Kraków (1375). In the name of King Louis I of Hungary he governed Ruthenia in 1372–1375.

Jan was the first Kmita who used the Szreniawa coat of arms with a cross.

Jan
Polish knights
1376 deaths
Ruthenian nobility
14th-century Polish nobility
Year of birth uncertain